Merle Erica Richardson  (born 1930 in New South Wales) is a former international lawn bowls competitor for Australia.

Bowls career

World Championships
Richardson won the fours and team event gold medals at the 1977 World Outdoor Bowls Championship in Worthing, England, the fours gold was with Dot Jenkinson, Connie Hicks and Lorna Lucas.

Eight years later she won three golds at the 1985 World Outdoor Bowls Championship in Melbourne, Australia. The golds were in the singles, the pairs with Fay Craig and the team event (Taylor Trophy).

Asia Pacific Championships
She won two medals at the Asia Pacific Bowls Championships including a gold medal in the 1985 singles at Tweed Heads, New South Wales.

Awards
Richardson was awarded the Medal of the Order of Australia for services to bowls in 1987. In 2011 she was inducted into Bowls Australia’s Hall of Fame.

References

1930 births
Living people
Australian female bowls players
Bowls World Champions
Recipients of the Medal of the Order of Australia
Recipients of the Australian Sports Medal
20th-century Australian women